Sree Pushpakabrahmana Seva Sangham (SPSS) is a registered charitable organisation which works for the progress of Pushpaka Brahmins, a group of culturally identical Brahmin castes like Pushpaka Unnis, Theeyatt Unnis, Kurukkals, Nambeesans etc. in Kerala.

Affiliation 
Sree Pushpakabrahmana Seva Sangham is affiliated to the All Kerala Brahmin Federation (AKBF), a branch of All India Brahmin Federation (AIBF).

Organisation structure and membership  

Sree Pushpakabrahmana Seva Sangham is organised in three tiers - Kendra Prathinidhi Sabha (Central Council), Jilla Prathinidhi Sabha (District Council) and Pradesika Sabha (Regional Council).

Zones
The districts are grouped under three zones for more co-ordination of activities. They are Dakshinamekhala (South Zone), Madhyamekhala (Central Zone) and Uttaramekhala (North Zone).

Publications
SPSS publishes a monthly magazine called "Pushpakadhwani", meaning "Voice of Pushpakas". SPSS also publishes books on art and cultural topics such as Koodiyattam, Brahmanipatt, Theeyaatt, Shodasa Samskaras etc.  Calendars and Diaries are also published annually.

Political influence

Sree Pushpaka Brahmana Seva Sangham works as a pressure group  and works towards greater political representation of Pushpaka Brahmins in governance. SPSS was able to bring forward various issues related to reservation in various political and social systems. However, it is not an  influential community organisation in Kerala politics.

References 

Non-profit organisations based in India
Organisations based in Thiruvananthapuram
Organisations based in Kerala
Religious organisations based in India
1968 establishments in Kerala
Religious organizations established in 1968